Dustabad (also Romanized as Dūstābād; also known as Dostābād) is a village in Dughayi Rural District, in the Central District of Quchan County, Razavi Khorasan Province, Iran. At the 2006 census, its population was 38, in 14 families.

References 

Populated places in Quchan County